This page lists all described species of the spider family Physoglenidae accepted by the World Spider Catalog :

C

Calcarsynotaxus

Calcarsynotaxus Wunderlich, 1995
 C. benrobertsi Rix, Roberts & Harvey, 2009 — Australia (Western Australia)
 C. longipes Wunderlich, 1995 (type) — Australia (Queensland)

Chileotaxus

Chileotaxus Platnick, 1990
 C. sans Platnick, 1990 (type) — Chile

M

Mangua

Mangua Forster, 1990
 M. caswell Forster, 1990 — New Zealand
 M. convoluta Forster, 1990 — New Zealand
 M. flora Forster, 1990 — New Zealand
 M. forsteri (Brignoli, 1983) — New Zealand (Auckland Is., Campbell Is.)
 M. gunni Forster, 1990 (type) — New Zealand
 M. hughsoni Forster, 1990 — New Zealand
 M. kapiti Forster, 1990 — New Zealand
 M. makarora Forster, 1990 — New Zealand
 M. medialis Forster, 1990 — New Zealand
 M. oparara Forster, 1990 — New Zealand
 M. otira Forster, 1990 — New Zealand
 M. paringa Forster, 1990 — New Zealand
 M. sana Forster, 1990 — New Zealand
 M. secunda Forster, 1990 — New Zealand

Meringa

Meringa Forster, 1990
 M. australis Forster, 1990 — New Zealand
 M. borealis Forster, 1990 — New Zealand
 M. centralis Forster, 1990 — New Zealand
 M. conway Forster, 1990 — New Zealand
 M. hinaka Forster, 1990 — New Zealand
 M. leith Forster, 1990 — New Zealand
 M. nelson Forster, 1990 — New Zealand
 M. otago Forster, 1990 (type) — New Zealand
 M. tetragyna Forster, 1990 — New Zealand

Microsynotaxus

Microsynotaxus Wunderlich, 2008
 M. calliope Wunderlich, 2008 — Australia (Queensland)
 M. insolens Wunderlich, 2008 (type) — Australia (Queensland)

N

Nomaua

Nomaua Forster, 1990
 N. arborea Forster, 1990 — New Zealand
 N. cauda Forster, 1990 — New Zealand
 N. crinifrons (Urquhart, 1891) (type) — New Zealand
 N. nelson Forster, 1990 — New Zealand
 N. perdita Forster, 1990 — New Zealand
 N. rakiura Fitzgerald & Sirvid, 2009 — New Zealand (Stewart Is.)
 N. repanga Fitzgerald & Sirvid, 2009 — New Zealand
 N. rimutaka Fitzgerald & Sirvid, 2009 — New Zealand
 N. taranga Fitzgerald & Sirvid, 2009 — New Zealand
 N. urquharti Fitzgerald & Sirvid, 2009 — New Zealand
 N. waikanae (Forster, 1990) — New Zealand
 N. waikaremoana Forster, 1990 — New Zealand

P

Pahora

Pahora Forster, 1990
 P. cantuaria Forster, 1990 — New Zealand
 P. graminicola Forster, 1990 — New Zealand
 P. kaituna Forster, 1990 — New Zealand
 P. media Forster, 1990 — New Zealand
 P. montana Forster, 1990 — New Zealand
 P. murihiku Forster, 1990 (type) — New Zealand
 P. rakiura Forster, 1990 — New Zealand
 P. taranaki Forster, 1990 — New Zealand
 P. wiltoni Forster, 1990 — New Zealand

Pahoroides

Pahoroides Forster, 1990
 P. aucklandica Fitzgerald & Sirvid, 2011 — New Zealand
 P. balli Fitzgerald & Sirvid, 2011 — New Zealand
 P. confusa Fitzgerald & Sirvid, 2011 — New Zealand
 P. courti Forster, 1990 — New Zealand
 P. forsteri Fitzgerald & Sirvid, 2011 — New Zealand
 P. gallina Fitzgerald & Sirvid, 2011 — New Zealand
 P. kohukohu Fitzgerald & Sirvid, 2011 — New Zealand
 P. whangarei Forster, 1990 (type) — New Zealand

Paratupua

Paratupua Platnick, 1990
 P. grayi Platnick, 1990 (type) — Australia (Victoria)

Physoglenes

Physoglenes Simon, 1904
 P. chepu Platnick, 1990 — Chile
 P. lagos Platnick, 1990 — Chile
 P. puyehue Platnick, 1990 — Chile
 P. vivesi Simon, 1904 (type) — Chile

R

Runga

Runga Forster, 1990
 R. akaroa Forster, 1990 — New Zealand
 R. flora Forster, 1990 — New Zealand
 R. moana Forster, 1990 — New Zealand
 R. nina Forster, 1990 (type) — New Zealand
 R. raroa Forster, 1990 — New Zealand

T

Tupua

Tupua Platnick, 1990
 T. bisetosa Platnick, 1990 (type) — Australia (Tasmania)
 T. cavernicola Platnick, 1990 — Australia (Tasmania)
 T. raveni Platnick, 1990 — Australia (Tasmania)
 T. troglodytes Platnick, 1990 — Australia (Tasmania)

Z

Zeatupua

Zeatupua Fitzgerald & Sirvid, 2009
 Z. forsteri Fitzgerald & Sirvid, 2009 (type) — New Zealand

References

Physoglenidae